Fine Manners is a 1926 American black-and-white silent comedy film directed initially by Lewis Milestone and completed by Richard Rosson for Famous Players-Lasky/Paramount Pictures. After an argument with actress Gloria Swanson, director Milestone walked off the project, causing the film to be completed by Rosson, who had picked up directorial tricks while working as an assistant director to Allan Dwan. The success of the film, being Rosson's first directorial effort since he co-directed Her Father's Keeper in 1917 with his brother Arthur Rosson, won him a long-term contract with Famous Players-Lasky.

Plot

Burlesque chorus girl Orchid Murphy (Gloria Swanson) attracts the attention of wealthy Brian Alden (Eugene O'Brien), who is posing as a writer while "slumming" in the city. Finding her manner quite refreshing compared to the women he usually meets in his circle, he falls in love with her and confesses his wealth. After she agrees to marriage, he leaves for a six-month tour of South America, and Orchid takes a course in "fine manners" to better prepare herself for Brian's world. She becomes too polished, however, and when asked by Brian to marry him upon his return, is happy to become herself again.

Cast
 Gloria Swanson as Orchid Murphy 
 Eugene O'Brien as Brian Alden 
 Helen Dunbar as Aunt Agatha 
 Roland Drew as Buddy Murphy
 John Miltern as Courtney Adams 
 Jack La Rue as New Year's Eve Celebrant  
 Ivan Lebedeff as Prince

Critical reception
Berkeley Daily Gazette wrote that in her first time in the role of a burlesque chorus girl, Gloria Swanson is "better than ever" and has "added another interesting screen portrayal to her long list of successes."  Miami News called the film "a most laughable comedy" and reported "Critics say this is Gloria's triumph".  St. Petersburg Times wote that Fine Manners stands head and shoulders above anything Gloria has done for the past year," and note that the story was written specifically for her. They wrote that the film "will prove to be the star's most popular vehicle."

Conversely, The New York Times noted  that Fine Manners was reminiscent of George Bernard Shaw's play, Pygmalion, writing "The photoplay has been constructed with meticulous attention to the edicts of the movie school of conventionalities; true characterization, intrigue and subtlety are conspicuously absent. Still, the idea of introducing a chorus girl from a burlesque show and having her try valiantly to grasp the ways of a less demonstrative society, does bring to mind Shaw's cockney heroine."  They noted that writers underscore the differences between the societal ranks of the two protagonists by emphasizing Orchid's ignorance of social amenities and by her being assigned a common name.  While granting that there are scenes in which the cinematography is clever, they made note that the story itself is not very absorbing.

Preservation
The film has survived the decades and is preserved in several archive houses such as George Eastman House, The Library of Congress and the Museum of Modern Art.

References

External links
 
 

1926 films
Silent American comedy films
American silent feature films
1920s English-language films
American black-and-white films
Films directed by Lewis Milestone
Films directed by Richard Rosson
Paramount Pictures films
Famous Players-Lasky films
1926 directorial debut films
1926 comedy films
1920s American films